Richard Diggs (died 1727) was a British stage actor.

He was a member of the Dury Lane company before 1718, when he switched to join John Rich's company at the Lincoln's Inn Fields Theatre and remained there until his death.

Selected roles
 Leander in The Coquet by Charles Molloy (1718)
 Rosny in Henry IV of France by Charles Beckingham (1719)
 Narbal in The Imperial Captives by John Mottley (1720)
 Truelove in Hob's Wedding by John Leigh (1720)
 Cleartes in Antiochus by John Mottley (1721)
 Arcas in Love and Duty by John Sturmy (1722)
 Galloper in The Compromise by John Sturmy (1722)
 Morvid in Edwin by George Jeffreys (1724)
 Vitiges in Belisarius by William Phillips (1724)
 Sharper in The Bath Unmasked by Gabriel Odingsells (1725)
 Governor of Tangier in Money the Mistress by Thomas Southerne (1726)
 Lychormas in The Fall of Saguntum by Philip Frowde (1727)

References

Bibliography
 Highfill, Philip H, Burnim, Kalman A. & Langhans, Edward A. A Biographical Dictionary of Actors, Actresses, Musicians, Dancers, Managers, and Other Stage Personnel in London, 1660-1800: Volume VIII. SIU Press, 1978.
 Johanson, Kristine. Shakespeare Adaptations from the Early Eighteenth Century: Five Plays. Rowman & Littlefield, 2013.

18th-century English people
English male stage actors
British male stage actors
18th-century English male actors
18th-century British male actors
1727 deaths